Barbara Freethy (born in California) is a #1 New York Times bestselling American author of women's fiction, contemporary romance and romantic suspense. She is a two-time winner of Romance Writers of America's RITA Award for Best Contemporary Single Title Romance for Daniel's Gift in 1997, and for Best Contemporary Single Title Romance for The Way Back Home in 2013. She has sold over 5 million books, with 18 books making the New York Times bestseller list. In 2014, she was named the Amazon KDP Bestselling Author of All Time.

Biography
Freethy is a native of California and earned a degree in Communications from UC Santa Barbara. She worked for a while in public relations before launching her writing career with novels published by Silhouette Romance, Harper Collins, Penguin and Simon and Schuster. In 2011, she started self-publishing by releasing backlist titles, and then new works. In 2012, she hit #1 on the New York Times Bestseller List with Summer Secrets. She attributes her success to building a consistent brand, as well as releasing multiple books—backlist and new—a year. In an article in The Economist, a columnist visited a booth of eight self-published authors which included Freethy and Bella Andre and reported that traditional publishers were skeptical of their claim that between them they'd sold 16 million books. Freethy was quoted as saying, "No one is counting our books in any survey that comes out in the media."

In 2014, Amazon's Kindle Worlds added Freethy's "The Callaway" series as one of four new offerings.

Bibliography

Angel's Bay

Bachelors & Bridesmaids

The Callaways 
1. 
2. 
3. 
4. 
4.5 
5. 
6. 
7. 
8.

Deception

Sanders Brothers

Wish

Stand-alone novels

Awards and reception

 1996 - Romantic Times Reviewers Choice award for Best Contemporary for Ryan's Return
 1997 - Romance Writers of America RITA Award for Best Contemporary Single Title for Daniel's Gift
 2013 - Romance Writers of America RITA Award for Best Contemporary Romance for The Way Back Home

References

External links 
 

Living people
21st-century American novelists
American women novelists
American romantic fiction writers
RITA Award winners
Year of birth missing (living people)
21st-century American women writers
Women romantic fiction writers
University of California, Santa Barbara alumni